The 1999 European Junior Badminton Championships were the 16th tournament of the European Junior Badminton Championships. It was held in Kelvin Hall, Glasgow, Scotland, from 3 April – 10 April 1999. German players won both the singles events and Girls' doubles title, while Danish players grabbed titles in  Boys' doubles and Mixed doubles. Germany also won the mixed team title.

Medalists

Results

Semi-finals

Finals

Medal table

References 

European Junior Badminton Championships
European Junior Badminton Championships
European Junior Badminton Championships
European Junior Badminton Championships
International sports competitions hosted by Scotland